The 2023 Spanish Motocross Championship season is the 65th Spanish Motocross Championship season. 

The series will have seven rounds across the country, running from February to May. José Butrón is the reigning champion in the Elite-MX1, after winning his eighth title in 2022. David Braceras is the reigning champion in Elite-MX2 after he won his first title in the previous season.

In 2023 points will be awarded to the top-five qualifiers for the first time. These points will not count towards the overall total for a rider per round, but will count towards the points total in the championship standings.  

The series will hold its second round at a new circuit in Lugo, Galicia named after two-time world champion Jorge Prado.

Race calendar and results
The full calendar with both dates and venues was released on 2nd December.

Elite-MX1

Elite-MX2

Circuit locations

Elite-MX1
Five time world champion Jeffrey Herlings was scheduled to compete at the opening round of the series but had to withdraw due to flu. Grand Prix winner Brian Bogers did compete in the first round in preparation for the 2023 FIM Motocross World Championship.

Participants

Riders Championship
Points are awarded to the top-five finishers of the qualifying race, in the following format:

Points are awarded to finishers of the main races, in the following format:

{|
|

Elite-MX2
Factory Husqvarna world championship riders Kay de Wolf and Lucas Coenen, as well as the factory KTM rider Sacha Coenen, competed in the first round in preparation for the 2023 FIM Motocross World Championship.

Participants

Riders Championship
Points are awarded to the top-five finishers of the qualifying race, in the following format:

Points are awarded to finishers of the main races, in the following format:

{|
|

References

Spanish Motocross Championship
Motocross Championship
Spanish Motocross Championship